Corby–Forsee Building, also known as the Corby Building, is a historic commercial building located at St. Joseph, Missouri. It was designed by the architectural form Eames & Young and built in 1910.  It is a 12-story, reinforced concrete building faced with yellow brick and grey-buff terra cotta detailing at the first, second, eleventh and twelfth floor levels. A one-story addition was designed by the architecture firm of Eckel & Aldrich and constructed in 1927 to house the trade halls of the St. Joseph Grain Exchange.

It was listed on the National Register of Historic Places in 1980.  It is located in the St. Joseph's Commerce and Banking Historic District.

References

Individually listed contributing properties to historic districts on the National Register in Missouri
Commercial buildings on the National Register of Historic Places in Missouri
Commercial buildings completed in 1910
Buildings and structures in St. Joseph, Missouri
National Register of Historic Places in Buchanan County, Missouri